Behm is a surname of Germanic origin. The name refers to:
Alexander Behm (1880–1952), German  physicist
Art Behm (b. 1932), American politician from North Dakota; state legislator
Charles Behm (1883–?), Luxembourgian Olympic gymnast
Cornelia Behm (b. 1951), German politician from Brandenburg
Ernst Behm (1830–1884), German geographer and statistician
Forrest Behm (1919–2015), American college football player
Magnus von Behm (1727–1806), Russian governor of Kamchatka
Eponym of the Behm Canal
Marc Behm (1925–2007), American novelist, actor and screenwriter
Roger Behm (1929–2005), Luxembourgian Olympic boxer
Rita Behm, (b. 1994) Finnish singer

See also
 Boehm
 Bohm

German-language surnames